Gangmaster is a 1994 Telugu film directed by B. Gopal. It has music composed by A. R. Rahman who signed the film because of his friendship with entrepreneur T. Subbarami Reddy, who was the producer of this film. It was dubbed into Tamil with the title Manitha Manitha. The film was a remake of Hindi film Sir. The film was a box office success.

Cast
Rajasekhar as Raja
Vani Viswanath as Swapna
Krishnam Raju as Purushottam
Nagma as Sandhya
Brahmanandam
Selva as Balu
Subhashri as Pooja
Charan Raj as Chakravarthy
Srihari
Murali Mohan
Babu Mohan
 Narra Venkateswara Rao

Soundtrack

The score and soundtrack for the film were composed by A. R. Rahman with lyrics by Veturi.
The Tamil version was titled Manitha Manitha and had lyrics by Vairamuthu. The song "Aa Siggu" was based on Rahman's own song "Raakozhi Rendum" from Uzhavan (1993).

Original version

Tamil version (Manitha Manitha)

References

External links
 

1994 films
1990s Telugu-language films
Indian action films
Telugu remakes of Hindi films
Films directed by B. Gopal
Films scored by A. R. Rahman
1994 action films